Aleksandr Yuryevich Yerokhin (born 13 October 1989) is a Russian professional footballer who plays for Zenit St. Petersburg and the Russia national football team as an attacking midfielder.

Career

Club
He grew up in the youth team of FC Lokomotiv Moscow. In 2008, he signed for FC Sheriff Tiraspol, and played a few matches for the team that season. By the 2009 season he had become a first-team player and became its playmaker.

On 28 June 2017, he signed a 3-year contract with FC Zenit Saint Petersburg. On the last day of the 2017–18 season, he scored 4 goals in a 6–0 victory over FC SKA-Khabarovsk.

On 7 April 2022, Yerokhin signed a new contract with Zenit until the end of the 2023–24 season.

International
He was called up to the Russia national football team in August 2015 for the UEFA Euro 2016 qualifiers against Sweden and against Liechtenstein. He made his debut for the team on 31 August 2016 in a friendly against Turkey.

On 11 May 2018, he was included in Russia's extended 2018 FIFA World Cup squad. On 3 June 2018, he was included in the finalized World Cup squad. He didn't make any group-stage appearances for the team, before he became the first player to be a fourth substitute in the extra time of the match after coming on to the field in the round of 16 match against Spain. He also appeared as a substitute in the quarterfinal shoot-out loss to Croatia.

Career statistics

Club

International

Statistics accurate as of match played 11 November 2021

International goals
 (Russia score listed first, score column indicates score after each Yerokhin goal)

Honors

Club
FC Sheriff Tiraspol
Moldovan National Division:
2008, 2009, 2010
Moldovan Cup:
2008, 2009
CIS Cup:
2009

Zenit Saint Petersburg
Russian Premier League: 2018–19, 2019–20, 2020–21, 2021–22
Russian Cup: 2019–20
Russian Super Cup: 2020, 2021, 2022

Individual
CIS Cup top scorer:
2009 (shared)

References

External links
Player page at the official Sheriff Tiraspol web-site (Russian)

1989 births
Living people
Sportspeople from Barnaul
Russian footballers
Russia youth international footballers
Russia national football B team footballers
Russia international footballers
Russian expatriate footballers
Expatriate footballers in Moldova
Russian expatriate sportspeople in Moldova
Association football midfielders
Moldovan Super Liga players
FC Sheriff Tiraspol players
FC Krasnodar players
Russian First League players
Russian Premier League players
FC SKA-Khabarovsk players
FC Ural Yekaterinburg players
FC Rostov players
2017 FIFA Confederations Cup players
FC Zenit Saint Petersburg players
2018 FIFA World Cup players